Charles Pic (born 15 February 1990) is a retired professional racing driver who drove in Formula One for two full seasons in  and , racing for Marussia F1 Team in the first season and then for Caterham in the second season.

Early career

Karting and Formula Renault
Born in Montélimar, France, Pic entered karting at a late age of 13 years. With the help of his godfather Éric Bernard, Pic achieved "strong results" in Italian and French championships.

In 2006, Pic made his Formula Renault debut, racing for La Filière. He finished the season as third and also became the rookie champion.

Formula Renault 3.5 Series

For 2008 Pic moved to Tech 1 Racing to contest the Formula Renault 3.5 Series. He was partnered by Julien Jousse and finished sixth in the points thanks to two wins at Circuit de Monaco – having dominated the entire weekend with pole position and fastest lap – and at Le Mans. He remained with Tech 1 for the following season and won twice more, at Silverstone and the Nürburgring, which helped him to finish third in the final standings. In 2009 he was also a member of the Renault Driver Development Programme.

GP2 Series
At the end of 2009 Pic switched to the 2009–10 GP2 Asia Series season with Arden International, and remained with the team into the 2010 GP2 Series season. Pic won on debut with the British outfit during the Asia Series' season-opener at Bahrain, before repeating the feat in the main series at the start of 2010 at Circuit de Catalunya. He eventually finished 10th in the drivers' standings.

For 2011 Pic moved to the Barwa Addax squad alongside future Formula 1 team-mate Giedo van der Garde.  Despite failing to score any points in the preceding Asia Series campaign, he hit back with a second career GP2 win at Catalunya where he led home Van der Garde for an Addax one-two finish. Another victory, this time on the streets of Monaco, helped move him up to third place in the drivers' championship. The two points he then scored for taking pole position at Valencia briefly moved Pic into the championship lead but, after retiring from both races and dropping back in the standings as a result, he eventually finished the season fourth overall, three points clear of Van der Garde.

Formula One
In November 2011 Pic made his debut at the wheel of a Formula One car, driving for Marussia Virgin Racing at the young driver test held at Yas Marina Circuit in Abu Dhabi. He was due to drive for a day and-a-half of the test, but the Virgin team decided to give him a further half-day of running after he encountered engine problems on the second day of the test.

During the test, several news sources reported that Pic had agreed a deal to race with the team in the 2012 season.

Marussia (2012)

After the conclusion of the 2011 Brazilian Grand Prix it was confirmed that Pic would indeed partner Timo Glock at the renamed Marussia F1 in 2012.  It was also confirmed that Pic would be mentored by ex-F1 driver and fellow countryman Olivier Panis. It was reported at the 2012 Hungarian Grand Prix that a feud was brewing between Pic and his team-mate after Pic blocked Glock during qualifying. He made his debut in the Australian Grand Prix finishing 15th. He however, retired in three consecutive races in Bahrain Grand Prix, Spanish Grand Prix and Monaco Grand Prix. In the next race, the Canadian Grand Prix, Pic finished 20th. In the British Grand Prix, Pic was given a five place grid penalty for changing his gearbox. In the season Pic was overtaken 70 times, which is a F1 record. Modena's Brabham, the previous record holder, was overtaken no fewer than 68 times in 1989.

Caterham (2013)

In November 2012 it was announced that Pic had signed a multi-year contract at the Renault-powered Caterham squad, with former GP2 team-mate and F1 rookie Giedo van der Garde later confirmed alongside him.

Pic made his Caterham debut at the 2013 Australian Grand Prix, finishing in 16th place, then finished 14th in Malaysia where he narrowly lost out to the Marussia of Jules Bianchi.

His season began to gather pace in Bahrain where Pic comfortably beat both Marussia cars and a Sauber, before a major upgrade to his Caterham at the Spanish Grand Prix established Pic as the quickest of the younger teams' drivers. He would continue this trend throughout the European portion of the season, scoring 15th-place finishes at Silverstone and the Hungaroring while displaying pace close to that of the established midfield runners.

Pic would equal his season-best result at the Korean Grand Prix, taking the chequered flag in 14th spot and within striking distance of Williams drivers Pastor Maldonado and Valtteri Bottas. However, as the campaign reached its final stretch the Frenchman suffered a succession of difficult races in India, Abu Dhabi and the United States, where balance issues prevented him from extracting the full potential of his car.

Pic recovered well at the season-closing Brazilian Grand Prix, where he qualified over half a second clear of team-mate van der Garde and well clear of the Marussias. However his race ended early when a suspension failure forced him into retirement on lap 58.

On 21 January 2014, Caterham's Team Principal Cyril Abiteboul confirmed that Pic would not be driving for Caterham in 2014:

Lotus (2014)
After being dropped by Caterham, Pic signed for Lotus F1 as their official reserve driver. This was announced at the car launch in Bahrain on 20 February 2014.

Formula E

Pic participated in the 2014–15 Formula E season, the inaugural season of the championship. He competed in the first round in Beijing for Andretti Autosport and finished in fourth position. Despite this points-scoring result, Pic was replaced prior to the second round by Matthew Brabham. Pic returned to Formula E for the fifth round of the championship in Miami driving for China Racing. He replaced Ho-Pin Tung at the team.

Post-motorsport
In 2015, Pic moved into a management role at French logistics company Charles André Group, of which he is now Managing Director of the Assets Department.

In 2022, Pic acquired full control of the French racing team DAMS.

Racing record

Career summary

Complete Formula Renault 3.5 Series results
(key) (Races in bold indicate pole position; races in italics indicate fastest lap)

Complete GP2 Series results
(key) (Races in bold indicate pole position; races in italics indicate fastest lap)

Complete GP2 Asia Series results
(key) (Races in bold indicate pole position; races in italics indicate fastest lap)

Complete Formula One results
(key)

 Did not finish, but was classified as he had completed more than 90% of the race distance.

Complete Formula E results
(key) (Races in bold indicate pole position; races in italics indicate fastest lap)

References

External links

 
 
 

1990 births
Living people
People from Montélimar
French racing drivers
French Formula One drivers
Formule Campus Renault Elf drivers
French Formula Renault 2.0 drivers
Formula Renault Eurocup drivers
World Series Formula V8 3.5 drivers
GP2 Asia Series drivers
GP2 Series drivers
Marussia Formula One drivers
Caterham Formula One drivers
Formula E drivers
Sportspeople from Drôme
Tech 1 Racing drivers
Arden International drivers
Campos Racing drivers
Manor Motorsport drivers
Andretti Autosport drivers
Motorsport team owners
SG Formula drivers
NIO 333 FE Team drivers
La Filière drivers